The Sách is a Vietic ethnic group of Vietnam, native people of the mountains of Central Vietnamese province of Quảng Bình. The exonym Sách might had originated from 15th century encounter and Sino-Vietnamese name for "register," which pre-modern Vietnamese texts used the term to designate villages that inhabited by various Austronesian and Austroasiatic highlanders, while according to Michel Ferlus, the name's meaning may have relation with uncertain ancient Chinese terminologies. In Vietnam, they are considered a sub-ethnic group of the Chứt. 

Perhaps so, among the Chuet tribes, the Sách have been exposed to classical Sinic civilization of the Vietnamese in the downstream plains, and they had been studied by French scholars and ethnologists since the early 20th century. The Sách primarily practice Vietnamese-influenced Mahayana Buddhism and Vietnamese customs. Cadiere (1905) suggested that among the Sach as well as the Nguon may be descendants of the insertion of Muong soldiers from Thanh Hoa that being sent to the region in the 17th century to quell off rebellion.

Today, the Sách reside in three mountainous districts of Minh Hóa, Tuyên Hóa and Bố Trạch, Quảng Bình province, Central Vietnam.

Footnotes

Vietic peoples
Ethnic groups in Vietnam
Quảng Bình province